Marrara is a northern suburb of the city of Darwin, Northern Territory, Australia.

History
Shown on Goyder's original surveys of Darwin in 1869 was the swamp between the suburb and the Darwin International Airport, but like Leanyer, the name is believed to be derived from an Aboriginal name for the area.

The streets in the residential area of the suburb are named after golf courses at the request of the Darwin Golf Club who developed the residential subdivision in order to develop the greens. It is also near the International Airport.

Economy
Airnorth has its head office on the property of Darwin International Airport in Marrara.

References

External links

https://web.archive.org/web/20110629040718/http://www.nt.gov.au/lands/lis/placenames/origins/greaterdarwin.shtml#m#m

Suburbs of Darwin, Northern Territory